The 96th Infantry Division (96. Infanterie-Division) was a formation of the Imperial German Army in World War I.

History
The 96th was formed on May 3rd, 1917 on the Eastern Front where it served there until February 1918 and was transferred to the Western Front where it fought in Lorraine and Vosges until the end of the war. Once the war ended, the division was sent back to Germany out of occupied territories where it was demobilized and disbanded in January 1919.

Order of Battle in 1917-18
177th Infantry Brigade 
Replacement Infantry Regiment No. 40
Landwehr Infantry Regiment No. 102
Reserve Infantry Regiment No. 244
4th Squadron / 1st Royal Saxon Hussar Regiment "King Albert" No. 18
Artillery Commander No. 140
Reserve Field Regiment No. 53
Engineer Battalion No. 96
Division News Commander No. 96

Command
The sole commander of the division was major general Friedrich von der Decken.

References
 96. Infanterie-Division (Chronik 1915/1918) - Der erste Weltkrieg
 Franz Bettag, Die Eroberung von Nowo Georgiewsk. Schlachten des Weltkrieges, Bd. 8 (Oldenburg, 1926)
 Hermann Cron et al., Ruhmeshalle unserer alten Armee (Berlin, 1935)
 Hermann Cron, Geschichte des deutschen Heeres im Weltkriege 1914-1918 (Berlin, 1937)
 Erich von Falkenhayn, Der Feldzug der 9. Armee gegen die Rumänen und Russen, 1916/17 (Berlin, 1921)
 Oberstleutnant a. D. Dr. Curt Treitschke, Der Rückmarsch aus Rumänien. Mit der Mackensen-Armee vom Sereth durch Siebenbürgen nach Sachsen (Dresden 1938)
 Günter Wegner, Stellenbesetzung der deutschen Heere 1825-1939. (Biblio Verlag, Osnabrück, 1993), Bd. 1
 Histories of Two Hundred and Fifty-One Divisions of the German Army which Participated in the War (1914-1918), compiled from records of Intelligence section of the General Staff, American Expeditionary Forces, at General Headquarters, Chaumont, France 1919 (1920)

Infantry divisions of Germany in World War I